Robert Gale may refer to:

Robert Gale (musician), trombonist
Robert Henry Otley Gale (1878–1950), Canadian politician
Robert Peter Gale (born 1945), medical researcher
Bob Gale (born 1951), screenwriter
Bob Gale (basketball) (1925–1975), American basketball player
Bob Gale (cricketer) (1933–2018), English cricketer and businessman
Robert Gale, character in the TV series 12 Monkeys